Alona Bondarenko was the defending champion, but she was defeated in the first round by Marion Bartoli.

Second seeded Serbian Ana Ivanovic was the champion, coming back from a 3-6, 0-3 deficit to beat Slovak Daniela Hantuchová. It was her third title of the year and her fifth career title overall.

Seeds

Draw

Finals

Top half

Bottom half

References

External links
Main Draw and Qualifying draw

Luxembourg Open
Fortis Championships Luxembourg
2007 in Luxembourgian tennis